Shahrzad Sepanlou (Persian: شهرزاد سپانلو) is a Persian American singer. She was born in Tehran and migrated to the United States in the mid-1980s. Sepanlou is currently a marriage and family therapist in Orange County, CA.

Sepanlou is the daughter of Mohammad-Ali Sepanlou and Partow Nooriala.

Like so many of her generation, Shahrzad experienced revolution, war, and repression, and her music often reflects these experiences.

Discography 
Sepanlou has recorded 6 albums.

Water, Fire, and Earth (in the band, Silhouettt)
Our Story
1001 Nights
TŌ (You)
One Day
A brief pause

References

External links
 Shahrzad Sepanlou live in Amsterdam (Video: Persian Dutch Network)
 Shahrzad Sepanlou Official Website

1975 births
People from Tehran
Iranian emigrants to the United States
Living people
21st-century American singers
21st-century American women singers
Iranian women pop singers